Yee is a surname.

Yee may also refer to:

"Yee" (song), a 2013 single by American DJ/producer Deorro
Yee Nunataks, a geological feature in Palmer Land, Antarctica
Yee Hope FC, a former Hong Kong football club

See also

 
Ye (disambiguation)
Yeehaw (disambiguation)
 YYE